Mong Ping is a town and seat of Mong Ping Township in Mongsat District, Shan State in eastern Myanmar. The town was not the capital of Mongping State in the Lawksawk area.

Geography
Mong Ping lies in a narrow valley about 60 km west of Kengtung. The entirety of the Mong Ping area is mountainous with high ranges running roughly in a north–south direction. The 1,831 m high Loi Wengwo mountain overlooks the narrow Mong Ping valley from the western side.

References

Mongsat District
Township capitals of Myanmar